Emelie Fabbeke (born 29 July 1986 as Emelie Lennartsson) is a Swedish badminton player.

Achievements

BWF Grand Prix 
The BWF Grand Prix has two level such as Grand Prix and Grand Prix Gold. It is a series of badminton tournaments, sanctioned by Badminton World Federation (BWF) since 2007.

Women's doubles

 BWF Grand Prix Gold tournament
 BWF Grand Prix tournament

BWF International Challenge/Series
Women's doubles

Mixed doubles

 BWF International Challenge tournament
 BWF International Series tournament
 BWF Future Series tournament

References

External links
 

1986 births
Living people
Swedish female badminton players
21st-century Swedish women